CBS Eye Animation Productions is an American animation studio division of CBS Studios owned by Paramount Global. The studio is closely associated with the Star Trek franchise with its first projects, Star Trek: Lower Decks and Star Trek: Prodigy. CBS reinstated it as an animation division in late 2018 before its re-merger with Viacom in 2019.

Background 
In the 1950s, CBS began to invest further into television programs, creating many live shows as I Love Lucy and Captain Kangaroo. However, in 1955 CBS purchased Terrytoons from Paul Terry under CBS Films. After the deal's closure in 1956, CBS placed Terrytoons the management of UPA's Gene Deitch (which they'd already secured a contract with CBS). Deitch would soon produce animated Tom Terrific shorts for Captain Kangaroo in 1957. Terrytoons would continue animation under CBS until its closure in 1972 after the corporate spin-off of the original Viacom International.

Despite the change of operations, CBS would continue to air many animated programs such Terrytoons (which they still owned) and Hanna-Barbera Productions within the 1970s and mid-1980s. Throughout the late 1980s and '90s, they acquired broadcasting rights to multiple series from different studios such as Teenage Mutant Ninja Turtles, Garfield and Friends (both now owned by parent company Paramount Global), Muppet Babies (now owned by Disney), as well serval toy-based shows.

The network would continue with broadcast syndication cartoons from serval companies (such as Nelvana) up until the late 1990s. In the 2000s, CBS (now merged with Westinghouse) switched to licensing more educational drive shows. Viacom had also acquired CBS as it agreed to air Nickelodeon/Nick Jr. on CBS until 2006 (after Viacom & CBS' split).

CBS would later resume airing animated programs by launching Cookie Jar TV until 2013.

History 
In late 2018, CBS Studios unveiled CBS Eye Animation Productions to produce animated content for CBS All Access (later Paramount+). Star Trek: Lower Decks would become the first animated television series, followed by Star Trek: Prodigy (a co-production with sister studio Nickelodeon Animation Studio). Initially, the studio would only create shows based on the Star Trek franchise but has invested in other shows such as The Harper House and Showtime's Our Cartoon President, as well as critically acclaimed live-action/animated news program, Tooning Out the News.

On September 29, 2022, the employees of CBS Eye Animation Productions formed a union with Animation Guild IATSE Local 839 to publicly submitting a letter for voluntary recognition.

List of CBS Eye Animation Studios productions

TV series

TV specials

Late Night Cartoons, Inc.

See also 
 Nickelodeon Animation Studio
 Paramount Animation
 MTV Animation
 List of animation studios owned by Paramount Global

References 

 
American animation studios
American companies established in 2018
Entertainment companies established in 2018
2018 establishments in New York (state)
Adult animation studios
CBS Television Network
Nickelodeon
Animation studios owned by Paramount Global